The Heckler & Koch MP2000 was an attempt to improve the MP5 series. Prototypes of the gun showed similarities to the UMP. An interesting feature of this gun was that it featured a silencing system which prevented the bullet from reaching supersonic speeds by venting some of the propellant gases. The gas vent hole could be closed in order to achieve normal bullet velocities.

MP2000